The 1923 TCU Horned Frogs football team represented Texas Christian University (TCU) as a member of the Southwest Conference (SWC) during the 1923 college football season. Led by first-year head coach Matty Bell, the Horned Frogs compiled an overall 4–5 record with a conference mark of 2–1, placing third in their inaugural year as members of the Southwest Conference. TCU played their home games at Panther Park in Fort Worth, Texas. The team's captain was Blair Cherry, who played end.

Schedule

References

TCU
TCU Horned Frogs football seasons
TCU Horned Frogs football